Kumara Sambhavam is a 1969 Indian Malayalam-language Hindu mythological film directed and produced by P. Subramaniam. Based on the epic poem of the poet Kalidasa of the same name, it stars Gemini Ganesan, Padmini, Srividya and Thikkurissy Sukumaran Nair. The film won the first ever Kerala State Film Award for Best Film. The film stood apart in technical quality when compared to previous Malayalam films and is hence regarded as a landmark in the history of Malayalam cinema. It also marked Sridevi's first Malayalam film. The film was dubbed in Tamil under the same title.

Cast 

Sridevi as Subramanian
Gemini Ganesan as Paramashivan
Padmini as Parvathi/Sathi
Srividya as Menaka
Thikkurissy Sukumaran Nair as Himavan, Parvathi's Father
Jose Prakash as Devendran
T. R. Omana
Adoor Pankajam
Aranmula Ponnamma as Parvathi's Mother
Rajasree as Urvasi
Kottarakkara Sreedharan Nair as Dakshan
Pankajavalli
S. P. Pillai
T. K. Balachandran as Naradan

Soundtrack 
The songs written by Vayalar Rama Varma and ONV Kurup were set to tune by Devarajan. Most of them were based on classical ragas, like ‘Priyasakhi Gangey…' (Madhuri) in Suddha Dhanyasi, ‘Satya Siva soundaryangal…' (K. J. Yesudas) in Kalyani, and the dance number ‘Maya natana…' (P. Leela and Radha-Jayalakshmi) set in Khamas. The other hits include ‘Indukalamouli….' (Madhuri), ‘Nalla Haimavatha…' (P. Susheela and chorus), and a ragamalika, ‘Saravana poykayil…' (Kamukara Purushotaman).

References

External links 
 

1969 films
1960s Malayalam-language films
Films directed by P. Subramaniam
Films based on poems
Films based on works by Kalidasa

Hindu mythological films